Long Tân may refer to:
 commune Long Tân, Bà Rịa–Vũng Tàu in Đất Đỏ District, Bà Rịa–Vũng Tàu Province
 commune Long Tân, Bình Phước in Bù Gia Mập District, Bình Phước Province
 commune Long Tan, Đồng Nai in Nhơn Trạch District, Đồng Nai Province
 commune Long Tân, Bình Dương in Dầu Tiếng District, Bình Dương Province
 commune Long Tân, Sóc Trăng in Ngã Năm District, Sóc Trăng Province
 Battle of Long Tan